Chad Studley Cornes (born 12 November 1979) is a former professional Australian rules footballer who played for the Port Adelaide Football Club and Greater Western Sydney Giants in the Australian Football League (AFL). He was a member of the Port Adelaide side which won the premiership in 2004. On 3 July 2013, he retired from AFL football due to a troublesome knee. Cornes is currently serving as a forward development coach for the Port Adelaide Football Club.

Playing career

Port Adelaide career (1999–2011)

Early career (1999–2003)
Cornes began his AFL career as a key-forward and after playing only 6 games in 1999, was a regular in the Power forward line in 2000, booting 22 goals. Between 2000 and 2003 Cornes and Tredrea formed one of the best forward partnerships in the AFL, with Chad playing up the ground demonstrating his great contested marking ability. Despite being one of the best forwards in the game, Cornes was moved into defence at the start of the 2004 season.

Career change (2004–2005)
In 2004, Cornes was moved to centre-half back. The new position worked wonders as Cornes began to single-handedly dominate games, earning himself his first All-Australian award, and finishing third in the Brownlow medal. The move to centre-half back was a key reason for Port Adelaide's dominance, which culminated in their first Premiership in 2004, defeating the Brisbane Lions by 40 points. He had a key defensive role on Brisbane Lions' forward Jonathan Brown during the Grand Final, restricting him to just one behind for the match.

After Port Adelaide's dominance in 2004, Cornes was again used as a key defender to great effect. However, Port Adelaide was unable to repeat its finals' glory of 2004, being eliminated by cross town rivals Adelaide in the first semi-final.

Leadership (2006–2007)
The 2006 was a disappointing one for Port Adelaide, and one which frustrated Cornes in particular. The season never really took off, and with Cornes now being a senior player, he was moved into the midfield to help the younger players. This move paid off as he dominated matches, which was a huge positive for the Power in an otherwise disappointing campaign. Cornes won the Showdown Medal in round 21.

In 2007, Cornes was a key midfielder and has a largely impressive season. Cornes finished the 2007 season with 643 disposals, and led the competition in kicks, and went into the Brownlow medal count as one of the favourites. The great form of Cornes in midfield was crucial to the side making the AFL Grand Final, which was a huge surprise to most, including Cornes. Despite not expecting to have a good season, when they did make the Grand Final the belief appeared to be strong but they were unable to win their second flag, going down to Geelong by a record 119 points

Injuries (2008–2010)
Port looked to bounce back from their Grand Final humiliation of the previous year when they took on Geelong in the opening round of 2008. Despite being close throughout the match, they were unable to win and that was the start of a four-game losing streak for the Power. Cornes suffered a broken finger in Round 6 against St Kilda but returned just three weeks later despite the nature of the break being very severe. After 2 years with on and off form, Cornes broke his finger again in mid-2010.

End of Port Adelaide career (2011)
Despite having to stay on the sidelines for the rest of the year, he played on in 2011. In August 2011 he announced that he would be retiring from the AFL after the following week's match against Collingwood.

Greater Western Sydney career (2012–2013)
Cornes came out of retirement, and was traded to the Giants during the 2011 October Trade Week. He was a playing assistant coach. On 3 July 2013 Cornes retired from AFL football.

Coaching career

Greater Western Sydney (2013–2015)
Post retirement, Chad Cornes remained with GWS in a full-time coaching role with their backlines, a position he held from 2013 to 2015.

Port Adelaide
On 21 September 2015, Cornes was announced as the SANFL coach of the Port Adelaide Football Club. He was elevated to a forward development coach with the Power at the end of 2017.

Family
In addition to his brother Kane Cornes, his father, Graham Cornes, is also a former VFL/SANFL footballer, playing 5 games for North Melbourne  and  317 games for Glenelg with a career spanning from 1967 to 1982. Graham also coached various AFL/SANFL teams between 1983 and 1994. His stepmother Nicole Cornes was a 2007 Labor candidate. He has three younger half-sisters paternally.

Playing statistics

|- style="background-color: #EAEAEA"
! scope="row" style="text-align:center" | 1999
|style="text-align:center;"|
| 35 || 6 || 5 || 4 || 19 || 1 || 20 || 10 || 3 || 0.8 || 0.7 || 3.2 || 0.2 || 3.3 || 1.7 || 0.5
|-
! scope="row" style="text-align:center" | 2000
|style="text-align:center;"|
| 35 || 21 || 22 || 18 || 156 || 81 || 237 || 81 || 25 || 1.0 || 0.9 || 7.4 || 3.9 || 11.3 || 3.9 || 1.2
|- style="background-color: #EAEAEA"
! scope="row" style="text-align:center" | 2001
|style="text-align:center;"|
| 35 || 24 || 21 || 26 || 218 || 95 || 313 || 126 || 23 || 0.9 || 1.1 || 9.1 || 4.0 || 13.0 || 5.3 || 1.0
|-
! scope="row" style="text-align:center" | 2002
|style="text-align:center;"|
| 35 || 25 || 29 || 19 || 297 || 108 || 405 || 171 || 26 || 1.2 || 0.8 || 11.9 || 4.3 || 16.2 || 6.8 || 1.0
|- style="background-color: #EAEAEA"
! scope="row" style="text-align:center" | 2003
|style="text-align:center;"|
| 35 || 22 || 29 || 30 || 258 || 86 || 344 || 172 || 46 || 1.3 || 1.4 || 11.7 || 3.9 || 15.6 || 7.8 || 2.1
|-
! scope="row" style="text-align:center;" | 2004
|style="text-align:center;"|
| 35 || 24 || 4 || 7 || 359 || 139 || 498 || 188 || 37 || 0.2 || 0.3 || 15.0 || 5.8 || 20.8 || 7.8 || 1.5
|- style="background-color: #EAEAEA"
! scope="row" style="text-align:center" | 2005
|style="text-align:center;"|
| 35 || 19 || 8 || 7 || 310 || 109 || 419 || 165 || 42 || 0.4 || 0.4 || 16.3 || 5.7 || 22.1 || 8.7 || 2.2
|-
! scope="row" style="text-align:center" | 2006
|style="text-align:center;"|
| 35 || 19 || 13 || 14 || 294 || 118 || 412 || 140 || 31 || 0.7 || 0.7 || 15.5 || 6.2 || 21.7 || 7.4 || 1.6
|- style="background-color: #EAEAEA"
! scope="row" style="text-align:center" | 2007
|style="text-align:center;"|
| 35 || 25 || 18 || 12 || 427 || 216 || 643 || 174 || 56 || 0.7 || 0.5 || 17.1 || 8.6 || 25.7 || 7.0 || 2.2
|-
! scope="row" style="text-align:center" | 2008
|style="text-align:center;"|
| 35 || 13 || 5 || 9 || 158 || 120 || 278 || 84 || 36 || 0.4 || 0.7 || 12.2 || 9.2 || 21.4 || 6.5 || 2.8
|- style="background-color: #EAEAEA"
! scope="row" style="text-align:center" | 2009
|style="text-align:center;"|
| 35 || 18 || 7 || 7 || 219 || 166 || 385 || 127 || 47 || 0.4 || 0.4 || 12.2 || 9.2 || 21.4 || 7.1 || 2.6
|-
! scope="row" style="text-align:center" | 2010
|style="text-align:center;"|
| 35 || 14 || 4 || 0 || 130 || 109 || 239 || 58 || 30 || 0.3 || 0.0 || 9.3 || 7.8 || 17.1 || 4.1 || 2.1
|- style="background-color: #EAEAEA"
! scope="row" style="text-align:center" | 2011
|style="text-align:center;"|
| 35 || 9 || 10 || 9 || 80 || 46 || 126 || 47 || 19 || 1.1 || 1.0 || 8.9 || 5.1 || 14.0 || 5.2 || 2.1
|-
! scope="row" style="text-align:center" | 2012
|style="text-align:center;"|
| 11 || 16 || 4 || 3 || 181 || 136 || 317 || 103 || 36 || 0.3 || 0.2 || 11.3 || 8.5 || 19.8 || 6.4 || 2.3
|- class="sortbottom"
! colspan=3| Career
! 255
! 179
! 165
! 3106
! 1530
! 4636
! 1646
! 457
! 0.7
! 0.6
! 12.2
! 6.0
! 18.2
! 6.5
! 1.8
|}

Honours and achievements

Team
AFL Premiership (Port Adelaide): 2004
AFL McClelland Trophy (Port Adelaide): 2002, 2003, 2004
 AFL Pre Season Cup (Port Adelaide): 2001, 2002
Individual
 3rd Brownlow Medal 2004
All-Australian: 2004, 2007
AFL Rising Star Nomination: 2000
Port Adelaide F.C. Vice Captain: 2006–2008
Port Adelaide F.C. Most Improved Player: 2002
Port Adelaide F.C. Best Finals Player: 2005
West End Showdown Medal XXI: 2006
Peter Badcoe VC Medal 2007 round 5
SANFL Hall Of Fame Inductee: 2014
 PAFC Hall of Fame Inductee 2023

References

External links

1979 births
Living people
Port Adelaide Football Club players
Port Adelaide Football Club Premiership players
Port Adelaide Football Club players (all competitions)
Greater Western Sydney Giants players
Glenelg Football Club players
All-Australians (AFL)
South Australian Football Hall of Fame inductees
Australian rules footballers from Adelaide
Chad
Australia international rules football team players
People educated at Sacred Heart College, Adelaide
One-time VFL/AFL Premiership players